R. W. Alexander Jesudasan is an Indian entomologist credited with the discovery of more than 60 species of whiteflies in South India.  He was a prominent educationist and served as Principal of Madras Christian College (2009–2020) and have been part of many education-related committees including NAAC Peer Team.

Education, research and career
Alexander is an alumnus of Guru Nanak College, Chennai and Madras Christian College, prestigious institutions in Chennai, India. He joined as a professor in Department of Zoology, Madras Christian College in 1986, where he served until his retirement in 2020.

He took charge as the Principal of Madras Christian College in 2009, serving the college in that capacity for 11 years.

Considering his contributions to entomology, University of Madras Awarded Alexander DSc in 2010 in recognition of his “contributions to the knowledge of Indian whiteflies (aleyrodidae: Hemiptera: Insecta) with an emphasis on whitefly-ant interaction”.

Leadership and contributions
During his leadership, the college was ranked 10th (2018) and 13th (2019) in the colleges category of the National Institutional Ranking Framework. College was also repeatedly ranked the Best College in Chennai and featured among top five in various surveys, like the "India Today" and "The Week" survey.

He also took initiative for many programmes like Sharing Knowledge You Had Abroad (SKY) programme, Sport for All etc. His contributions to infrastructural development in the campus are also notable. He was instrumental in the establishment of various facilities like Indoor Stadium, modernized Science Laboratories, Modernization of Women's Lounge, Solar Power Plant, two new Women's Halls, modernization of Student Centre, Air-conditioning of Anderson Hall and Bishop Heber Chapel.

Contributions to entomology

Alexander is credited with the discovery many species of Whiteflies:

 Aleurocanthus: 9 Species
 Aleuroclava: 16 Species
 Aleurolobus: 11 Species
 Aleuropapillatus: 1 Species
 Cockerelliella: 1 Species
 Cohicaleyrodes: 1 Species
 Crenidorsum: 5 Species
 Dialeurodes: 1 Species
 Dialeurolonga: 2 Species
 Massilieurodes: 1 Species
 Pealius: 3 Species
 Rhachisphora: 2 Species
 Singhiella: 2 Species
 Singhius: 1 Species
 Tetraleurodes: 3 Species
 Zaphanera: 1 Species

See also
 Prof. Dr. M. Abel
 The Rev. John Anderson
 Very Rev. Dr. William Miller

References 

University of Madras alumni
Church of South India

Madras Christian College

Scholars from Tamil Nadu

Madras Christian College alumni
Indian zoologists
Tamil people
Indian Christians

Year of birth missing (living people)
Living people